George Boote (1878 – 1930) was an English football goalkeeper who played in the Football League for Burslem Port Vale and Stoke.

Career
Boote played one match for Stoke; his one appearance came in a 1–1 draw with Nottingham Forest in October 1901. He then played for local amateur sides Halmerend Rovers and Silverdale Town before joining Burslem Port Vale as Arthur Box's deputy in November 1905. His debut came in a 2–1 defeat to Barnsley at the Athletic Ground on 27 January 1906. He only played a further two games before being released at the end of the season. He then moved on to Knutton Rovers.

Career statistics
Source:

References

Footballers from Stoke-on-Trent
English footballers
Association football goalkeepers
Stoke City F.C. players
Port Vale F.C. players
English Football League players
1878 births
1930 deaths